Pecos Junction station is a Denver Regional Transportation District (RTD) commuter rail station that is served by the B Line and G Line. The station was originally scheduled to open in 2016, but was delayed with the rest of the G Line. It opened on April 26, 2019.

The station is located east of Pecos Street along 62nd Avenue. It consists of an island platform connected by a pedestrian bridge to a bus loading zone and a 300-space parking lot.

References

RTD commuter rail stations in Denver
Railway stations in the United States opened in 2019
2019 establishments in Colorado